Stubble may mean:
 Stubble, short stumps of hair that grow back on a man's face after shaving.
 Designer stubble: shaving stubble of a type that became popular in the 1980s
 Stubble, the short stalks left in a field after crops have been harvested: see crop residue